The Rural Municipality of Lakeview No. 337 is a rural municipality (RM) in the Canadian province of Saskatchewan within Census Division No. 10 and  Division No. 4.

History 
The RM of Lakeview No. 337 incorporated as a rural municipality on December 13, 1909.

Geography

Communities and localities 
The following urban municipalities are surrounded by the RM.

Towns
 Wadena

The following unincorporated communities are within the RM.

Organized hamlets
 Hendon

Localities
 Clair
 Paswegin
 Tornea

Demographics 

Attractions 
 Wadena & District Museum & Nature Center
 Wadena Wildlife Wetlands
 Little Quill Lake

Government 
The RM of Lakeview No. 337 is governed by an elected municipal council and an appointed administrator that meets on the second Wednesday of every month. The reeve of the RM is Mervin Kryzanowski while its administrator is Carrie Turnbull. The RM's office is located in Wadena.

Transportation 
 Saskatchewan Highway 5
 Saskatchewan Highway 35
 Saskatchewan Highway 49
 Saskatchewan Highway 640
 Saskatchewan Highway 755
 Saskatchewan Highway 758
 Wadena Airport

See also 
List of rural municipalities in Saskatchewan

References 

Lakeview

Division No. 10, Saskatchewan